This is a list of dams and reservoirs in the State of New York.

Reservoirs
Alcove Reservoir
Allegheny Reservoir
Amawalk Reservoir
Ashokan Reservoir
Basic Creek Reservoir
Beacon Reservoir, Dutchess County
Beacon Reservoir, Putnam County
Blake Falls Reservoir
Bog Brook Reservoir
Boyds Corner Reservoir
Browns Pond
Lake Capra
Cannonsville Reservoir
Carry Falls Reservoir
Chadwick Lake
Cobb's Hill Reservoir
Colgate Lake
Cooper Lake
Croton Falls Reservoir
Cross River Reservoir
Cuba Lake
DeForest Lake
Delta Reservoir
DeRuyter Reservoir
Diverting Reservoir
East Branch Reservoir
Eaton Reservoir
Glenmere Lake
Grassy Sprain Reservoir
Great Sacandaga Lake
Hillview Reservoir
Highland Park Reservoir
Hinckley Reservoir
Indian Brook Reservoir
Jacqueline Kennedy Onassis Reservoir
Jamesville Reservoir
Jerome Park Reservoir
Kenozia Lake
Kensico Reservoir
Lake Maratanza
Lake Innisfree
Lebanon Reservoir
Lighthouse Hill Reservoir
Lower Reservoir
Middle Branch Reservoir
Mill Brook Reservoir
Mongaup Falls Reservoir
Morris Reservoir
Muscoot Reservoir
Neversink Reservoir
New Croton Reservoir
Pepacton Reservoir
Ramhannock Reservoir
Ridgewood Reservoir
Rondout Reservoir
Salmon River Reservoir
Schoharie Reservoir
Sheldrake Lake
Stewarts Bridge Reservoir
Sturgeon Pond
Swinging Bridge Reservoir
Tomhannock Reservoir
Tarrytown Reservoir
Titicus Reservoir
Lake Washington
Waterport Reservoir
West Branch Reservoir
Westcott Reservoir
Whitney Point Reservoir
Woodland Reservoir

Dams
Amawalk Dam
Blenheim-Gilboa Pumped Storage Power Project
Boyds Corner Dam
Cannonsville Dam
Cross River Dam
Cuba Lake Dam
Cuddebackville Dam
Conklingville Dam
Downsville Dam
East Sidney Dam
Federal Dam
Gilboa Dam
Jamesville Dam
Kensico Dam
Marcy Dam
Merrian Dam
Mount Morris Dam
Muscoot Dam
Neversink Dam
New Croton Dam
Olivebridge Dam
Rushford / Caneadea Dam at Rushford Lake
Stewart's Dam
Sullivanville Dam
Warrensburg Hydroelectric Dam

See also

List of lakes in New York

New York
Dams and reservoirs
New York
Dams and reservoirs
Water supply infrastructure of New York (state)